Friedrich Christian Anton Lang (December 5, 1890 – August 2, 1976), known as Fritz Lang, was an Austrian film director, screenwriter, and producer who worked in Germany and later the United States. One of the best-known émigrés from Germany's school of Expressionism, he was dubbed the "Master of Darkness" by the British Film Institute. He has been cited as one of the most influential filmmakers of all time.

Lang's most celebrated films include the groundbreaking futuristic Metropolis (1927) and the influential M (1931), a film noir precursor. His 1929 film Woman in the Moon showcased the use of a multi-stage rocket, and also pioneered the concept of a rocket launch pad (a rocket standing upright against a tall building before launch having been slowly rolled into place) and the rocket-launch countdown clock. His other major films include Dr. Mabuse the Gambler (1922), Die Nibelungen (1924), and after moving to Hollywood in 1934, Fury (1936), You Only Live Once  (1937), Hangmen Also Die! (1943), The Woman in the Window (1944), Scarlet Street (1945) and The Big Heat (1953). He became a naturalized citizen of the United States in 1939.

Life and career

Early life
Lang was born in Vienna, as the second son of Anton Lang (1860–1940), an architect and construction company manager, and his wife Pauline "Paula" Lang ( Schlesinger; 1864–1920). His mother was born Jewish and converted to Catholicism. His father was described as a “lapsed Catholic.” He was baptized on December 28, 1890, at the Schottenkirche in Vienna. He had an elder brother, Adolf (1884–1961).

Lang's parents were of Moravian descent. At one point, he noted that he was “born [a] Catholic and very puritan". Ultimately describing himself as an atheist, Lang believed that religion was important for teaching ethics.

After finishing school, Lang briefly attended the Technical University of Vienna, where he studied civil engineering and eventually switched to art. He left Vienna in 1910 in order to see the world, traveling throughout Europe and Africa, and later Asia and the Pacific area. In 1913, he studied painting in Paris.

At the outbreak of World War I, Lang returned to Vienna and volunteered for military service in the Austrian army and fought in Russia and Romania, where he was wounded four times and lost sight in his right eye, the first of many vision issues he would face in his lifetime. While recovering from his injuries and shell shock in 1916, he wrote some scenarios and ideas for films. He was discharged from the army with the rank of lieutenant in 1918 and did some acting in the Viennese theater circuit for a short time before being hired as a writer at Decla Film, Erich Pommer's Berlin-based production company. In 1919, he married for the first time to Lisa Rosenthal, a Jewish woman; in 1921, she died under mysterious circumstances, of a single gunshot wound deemed to have been fired by a sidearm weapon from World War I.

Expressionist films: the Weimar years (1918–1933)
Lang's writing stint was brief, as he soon started to work as a director at the German film studio UFA, and later Nero-Film, just as the Expressionist movement was building. In this first phase of his career, Lang alternated between films such as Der Müde Tod ("The Weary Death") and popular thrillers such as Die Spinnen ("The Spiders"), combining popular genres with Expressionist techniques to create an unprecedented synthesis of popular entertainment with art cinema.

In 1920, Lang met his future wife, the writer Thea von Harbou. She and Lang co-wrote all of his movies from 1921 through 1933, including Dr. Mabuse, der Spieler ("Dr. Mabuse the Gambler," 1922 - which ran for over four hours, in two parts in the original version, and was the first in the Dr. Mabuse trilogy), the five-hour Die Nibelungen (1924), the dystopian film Metropolis (1927), and the science fiction film Woman in the Moon (1929). Metropolis went far over budget and nearly destroyed UFA, which was bought by right-wing businessman and politician Alfred Hugenberg. It was a financial flop, as were his last silent films Spies (1928) and Woman in the Moon, produced by Lang's own company.

In 1931, independent producer Seymour Nebenzahl hired Lang to direct M for Nero-Film. His first "talking" picture, considered by many film scholars to be a masterpiece of the early sound era, M is a disturbing story of a child murderer (Peter Lorre in his first starring role) who is hunted down and brought to rough justice by Berlin's criminal underworld. M remains a powerful work; it was remade in 1951 by Joseph Losey, but this version had little impact on audiences, and has become harder to see than the original film.

During the climactic final scene in M, Lang allegedly threw Peter Lorre down a flight of stairs in order to give more authenticity to Lorre's battered look. Lang, who was known for being hard to work with, epitomized the stereotype of the tyrannical Germanic film director, a type embodied also by Erich von Stroheim and Otto Preminger; Lang wore a monocle adding to the stereotype.

In the films of his German period, Lang produced a coherent oeuvre that established the characteristics later attributed to film noir, with its recurring themes of psychological conflict, paranoia, fate and moral ambiguity.

At the end of 1932, Lang started filming The Testament of Dr. Mabuse. Adolf Hitler came to power in January 1933, and by March 30, the new regime banned it as an incitement to public disorder. Testament is sometimes deemed an anti-Nazi film, as Lang had put phrases used by the Nazis into the mouth of the title character. A screening of the film was cancelled by Joseph Goebbels, and it was later banned by the Reich Ministry of Public Enlightenment and Propaganda. In banning the film, Goebbels stated that the film "showed that an extremely dedicated group of people are perfectly capable of overthrowing any state with violence", and that the film posed a threat to public health and safety.

Lang was worried about the advent of the Nazi regime, partly because of his Jewish heritage, whereas his wife and co-screenwriter Thea von Harbou had started to sympathize with the Nazis in the early 1930s, and later joined the NSDAP in 1940. They soon divorced. Lang's fears would be realized following his departure from Austria, as under the Nuremberg Laws he would be identified as half-Jewish by ethnicity even though his mother was a converted Roman Catholic, and he was raised as such.

Emigration
According to Lang, propaganda minister Joseph Goebbels called Lang to his offices to inform him – apologetically – that The Testament of Dr. Mabuse was being banned but, nevertheless, he was so impressed by Lang's abilities as a filmmaker (especially Metropolis), that he offered Lang the position of head of German film studio UFA. Lang said it was during that meeting he had decided to leave for Paris – but that the banks had closed by the time the meeting was over. Lang claimed that, after selling his wife's jewelry, he fled by train to Paris that evening, leaving most of his money and personal possessions behind. However, his passport of the time showed that he traveled to and from Germany a few times during 1933.

Lang left Berlin for good on July 31, 1933, four months after his meeting with Goebbels and his initial departure. He moved to Paris, having divorced Thea von Harbou, who stayed behind, earlier in 1933.

In Paris, Lang filmed a version of Ferenc Molnár's Liliom, starring Charles Boyer. That was Lang's only film in French (excluding the French version of Testament). He then moved to the United States.

Hollywood career (1936–1957) 
Lang made twenty-three features in his 20-year American career, working in a variety of genres at every major studio in Hollywood, and occasionally producing his films as an independent. He became a naturalized citizen of the United States in 1939.

Signing first with MGM Studios, Lang's crime drama Fury (1936) saw Spencer Tracy cast as a man who is wrongly accused of a crime and nearly killed when a lynch mob sets fire to the jail where he is awaiting trial. However, in Fury, he was not allowed to represent black victims in a lynching scenario or to criticize racism, which was his original intention. By the time Fury was released, Lang had been involved in the creation of the Hollywood Anti-Nazi League, working with Otto Katz, a Czech who was a Comintern spy. He made four films with an explicitly anti-Nazi theme, Man Hunt (1941), Hangmen Also Die! (1943), Ministry of Fear (1944) and Cloak and Dagger (1946). Man Hunt, wrote Dave Kehr in 2009, "may be the best" of the "many interventionist films produced by the Hollywood studios before Pearl Harbor" as it is "clean and concentrated, elegant and precise, pointed without being preachy."

His American films were often compared unfavorably to his earlier works by contemporary critics, although the restrained Expressionism of these films is now seen as integral to the emergence and evolution of American genre cinema, film noir in particular. Scarlet Street (1945), one of his films featuring Edward G. Robinson and Joan Bennett, is considered a central film in the genre.

One of Lang's most praised films noir is the police drama The Big Heat (1953), known for its uncompromising brutality, especially for a scene in which Lee Marvin throws scalding coffee on Gloria Grahame's face. As Lang's visual style simplified, in part due to the constraints of the Hollywood studio system, his worldview became increasingly pessimistic, culminating in the cold, geometric style of his last American films, While the City Sleeps (1956) and Beyond a Reasonable Doubt (1956).

Last films (1959–1963)
Finding it difficult to find congenial production conditions and backers in Hollywood, particularly as his health declined with age, Lang contemplated retirement. The German producer Artur Brauner had expressed interest in remaking The Indian Tomb (from an original story by Thea von Harbou, that Lang had developed in the 1920s which had ultimately been directed by Joe May), so Lang returned to Germany to make his "Indian Epic" (consisting of The Tiger of Eschnapur and The Indian Tomb).

Following the production, Brauner was preparing for a remake of The Testament of Dr. Mabuse when Lang approached him with the idea of adding a new original film to the series. The result was The Thousand Eyes of Dr. Mabuse (1960), whose success led to a series of new Mabuse films, which were produced by Brauner (including the remake of The Testament of Dr. Mabuse), though Lang did not direct any of the sequels. Lang was approaching blindness during the production, and it was his final project as director.

In 1963, he appeared as himself in Jean-Luc Godard's film Contempt.

Death and legacy
On February 8, 1960, Lang received a star on the Hollywood Walk of Fame for his contributions to the motion picture industry, located at 1600 Vine Street.

Lang died from a stroke in 1976 and was interred in the Forest Lawn Hollywood Hills Cemetery in the Hollywood Hills of Los Angeles.

While his career had ended without fanfare, Lang's American and later German works were championed by the critics of the Cahiers du cinéma, such as François Truffaut and Jacques Rivette. Truffaut wrote that Lang, especially in his American career, was greatly underappreciated by "cinema historians and critics" who "deny him any genius when he 'signs' spy movies ... war movies ... or simple thrillers." Filmmakers that were influenced by his work include Jacques Rivette, William Friedkin, Steven Spielberg, Christopher Nolan, Luis Buñuel, Osamu Tezuka, Alfred Hitchcock, Jean-Luc Godard and Stanley Kubrick.

Lang is credited with launching or developing many different genres of film. Philip French of The Observer believed that Lang helped craft the "entertainment war flick" and that his interpretation of the story of Bonnie and Clyde "helped launch the Hollywood film noir". Geoff Andrew of the British Film Institute believed he set the "blueprint for the serial killer movie" through M.

In December 2021 Lang was the subject for BBC Radio 4's In Our Time.

Preservation
The Academy Film Archive has preserved a number of Lang's films, including Human Desire and Man Hunt.

Filmography

Awards
 Silver Hand in 1931, for his film M, by the German Motion Picture Arts Association
 Commander Cross, Order of Merit in 1957 and 1966
 Golden Ribbon of Motion Picture Arts in 1963 by the Federal Republic of Germany
 Order of Arts and Letters from France in 1965
 Plaque from El Festival Internacional del Cine de San Sebastian in 1970
 Order of the Yugoslavia Flag with a Golden Wreath in 1971
 Honorary Professor of Fine Arts by the University of Vienna, Austria, in 1973

References

Further reading
 . "Je les chasserai jusqu'au bout du monde jusqu'à ce qu'ils en crèvent," Paris: Éditions n°1, 1997; .
 Friedrich, Otto. City of Nets: A Portrait of Hollywood in the 1940s; New York: Harper & Row, 1986; . (See e.g. pp. 45–46 for anecdotes revealing Lang's arrogance.)
 McGilligan, Patrick. Fritz Lang: The Nature of the Beast; New York: St. Martin's Press, 1997; .
 Schnauber, Cornelius. Fritz Lang in Hollywood; Wien: Europaverlag, 1986;  (in German).
 Shaw, Dan. Great Directors: Fritz Lang. Senses of Cinema issue 22, October 2002.
  – contains interviews with Lang and a discussion of the making of the film M.

External links

 
 
 Fritz Lang Bibliography (via UC Berkeley Media Resources Center)
 Senses of Cinema – Biographie
 Fritz Lang at filmportal.de
 Photos of Fritz Lang and cast of Hangmen Also Die by Ned Scott
 The Fritz Lang papers at the American Heritage Center

1890 births
1976 deaths
American atheists
American film directors
American male screenwriters
American people of Austrian-Jewish descent
American people of Moravian-German descent
Austrian emigrants to Germany
Austrian atheists
Austrian expatriates in France
Austrian expatriates in Germany
Austrian film directors
Austrian people of Jewish descent
Austrian people of Moravian-German descent
Austro-Hungarian military personnel of World War I
Burials at Forest Lawn Memorial Park (Hollywood Hills)
English-language film directors
German-language film directors
Science fiction film directors
People from Margareten
Film people from Vienna
German emigrants to the United States
TU Wien alumni
Western (genre) film directors
Commanders Crosses of the Order of Merit of the Federal Republic of Germany
Horror film directors
Silent film screenwriters
20th-century American male writers
20th-century American screenwriters
Naturalized citizens of the United States